Scrabble is an unincorporated community in Berkeley County, West Virginia, United States. According to the Geographic Names Information System, the community has been known as Hard Scrabble, Hard Scrabble Town, and Hardscrabble throughout its history.

The community most likely was so named on account of treacherous local terrain.

Scrabble Historic District

Scrabble was listed on the National Register of Historic Places in 2006, with the district extending into Jefferson County. The historic district comprises  of late 19th century buildings mixed with agricultural lands. The most prominent structures are the 1920 Mount Wesley Methodist Episcopal Church and the 1882 Scrabble School. A number of contemporary I-houses and smaller vernacular houses complete the district. The individually listed George Washington Hollida House is also in the district. The district lies primarily on Scrabble Road and Dam No. 4 Road in Berkeley County, and Silver Spring Road in Jefferson County. The county line is marked by Rocky Marsh Run, which runs through the community.

References

Unincorporated communities in Berkeley County, West Virginia
Unincorporated communities in West Virginia
Historic districts in Berkeley County, West Virginia
National Register of Historic Places in Berkeley County, West Virginia
I-house architecture in West Virginia
Vernacular architecture in West Virginia
Houses on the National Register of Historic Places in West Virginia
Houses in Berkeley County, West Virginia